Steven Edward Carter (born 1962-09-12 in New York City) is a former professional American football wide receiver in the National Football League who played for the Tampa Bay Buccaneers in 1987 at the age of 25. The 5'10" 170 pounds receiver played college football at Albany State University in Albany, Georgia.

References

1962 births
Living people
Players of American football from New York City
American football wide receivers
Albany State Golden Rams football players
Tampa Bay Buccaneers players
National Football League replacement players